Portland Mercado is a collection of food carts in Portland, Oregon, United States. The carts are located in Southeast Portland's Mt. Scott-Arleta neighborhood, at the border of Foster-Powell.

Description and history 
The "pod" opened in 2015 and focuses on Latin American cuisine, community and  culture. Business have included:
 Alecocina
 Barrio
 Don Churro
 El Coquí
 Fernando's Alegría
 Havana Station
 Kaah Market
 La Arepa
 Mixteca Catering
 Principe Maya
 Que Bacano
 Tierra del Sol
 Tita's Kitchen

See also
 Hispanics and Latinos in Portland, Oregon

References

External links

 

2015 establishments in Oregon
Food carts in Portland, Oregon
Latin American restaurants in Portland, Oregon
Mt. Scott-Arleta, Portland, Oregon